The 1868 New Jersey gubernatorial election was held on November 3, 1868. Democratic nominee Theodore Fitz Randolph defeated Republican nominee John Insley Blair with 51.42% of the vote.

General election

Candidates
Theodore Fitz Randolph, former State Senator for Hudson County (Democratic)
John Insley Blair, multimillionaire railroad magnate (Republican)

Results

References

1868
New Jersey
Gubernatorial
November 1868 events